Van Kamp is a surname. Notable people with the surname include:

Jeff Van Kamp (born 1962), American police officer and professional wrestler
Merete Van Kamp (born 1961), Danish model and actress

See also
Van Camp
Van de Kamp
Van der Kamp

Surnames of Dutch origin